Dreaming of Joseph Lees is a 1999 British romantic drama film directed by Eric Styles and starring Rupert Graves, Samantha Morton and Nicholas Woodeson. It is an adaptation of a story written by Catherine Linstrum set in rural England in the late 1950s. The film was distributed by the Fox Entertainment Group. Samantha Morton's performance in the film won the Evening Standard Award British Film Award for Best Actress.

Synopsis 
Set in rural England in the 1950s Eva (Samantha Morton) fantasises about her handsome, worldly cousin Joseph Lees (Rupert Graves), with whom she fell in love as a girl. However, stuck in a closed community she becomes the object of someone else's fantasy, Harry (Lee Ross). When Harry learns that Eva is planning to leave the village in order to live with and look after the injured Lees, he devises a gruesome scheme in order to force her to stay and look after him.

Cast 
Rupert Graves - Joseph Lees
Samantha Morton	 - Eva
Nicholas Woodeson - Mr. Dian
Lee Ross	 - Harry
Felix Billson - Robert
Lauren Richardson - Janie
Frank Finlay - Father
Vernon Dobtcheff	 - Italian Doctor
Miriam Margolyes	 - Signora Caldoni
Holly Aird - Maria
Freddy Douglas - Danny (as Freddie Douglas)
Richie Tongé - Nude Model
Harry Selby - First Boxer
Juan Thomas - Referee
Emma Cunniffe - Red-Haired Girl

References

External links 

1999 films
1999 romantic drama films
British romantic drama films
Films scored by Zbigniew Preisner
Fox Searchlight Pictures films
1990s English-language films
1990s British films